Anthony Didier Thomas Goelzer (born 12 September 1998) is a French professional footballer who plays as a left back for Vaduz.

Club career
In February 2019, he signed a four year contract with Grasshopper Zürich. 

On 29 July 2021, he moved to Kriens, also in Switzerland.

After one season with Kriens, Goelzer signed for Vaduz, and became part of the history-making squad that became the first team from Liechtenstein to reach the group stages of a European club competition. He scored Vaduz's first ever group stage goal, in a 4-1 defeat against AZ in the Netherlands.

References

External links

 

1998 births
Footballers from Lille
Living people
Association football defenders
French footballers
Valenciennes FC players
Grasshopper Club Zürich players
SC Kriens players
FC Vaduz players
Championnat National 3 players
Ligue 2 players
Swiss Super League players
Swiss Challenge League players
French expatriate footballers
Expatriate footballers in Switzerland
French expatriate sportspeople in Switzerland
Expatriate footballers in Liechtenstein
French expatriate sportspeople in Liechtenstein